Federal Science and Technical College, Kuta is a federal government own technical and science secondary school in Shiroro, Niger State.

It was established Federal alongside nine other federal unity schools by the Federal Government of Nigeria in 1988 as part of scientific and technological growth in Nigeria, it began operating in 1991 having change to its present name in 2002.

Notes 

1988 establishments in Nigeria
Secondary schools in Nigeria
Educational institutions established in 1988
Government schools in Nigeria

External links 
FSTC kuta website